Hilary Abner Herbert (March 12, 1834 – March 6, 1919) was Secretary of the Navy in the second administration of President Grover Cleveland.  He also served as a member of the United States House of Representatives from Alabama.

Biography
Herbert was born in Laurensville, South Carolina in 1834, and moved with his family to Greenville, Alabama in 1846. He was educated at the University of Alabama and the University of Virginia, where he was a member of the Delta Kappa Epsilon fraternity (Eta chapter). He practiced law in Greenville until the Civil War.

Herbert entered the Confederate Army as a second lieutenant. He served as captain of the Greenville Guards, and was later promoted to the rank of colonel of the Eighth Regiment, Alabama Infantry. Herbert was wounded at the Battle of the Wilderness May 6, 1864.

After the war, Herbert returned to his law practice in Greenville, Alabama. He was elected to Congress in 1877 from Montgomery, Alabama as a Democrat. He served eight terms in this office. During his tenure as Congressman, Herbert was chairman of the Committee on Naval Affairs and was largely responsible for the increased appropriations which led to the revival of the United States Navy. However, he was among those who favored a more limited program than the one proposed by Secretary of the Navy Benjamin F. Tracy in 1890, which called for 40 battleships; only four battleships were authorized as a result. Tracy had been influenced by the works of naval strategist Captain Alfred Thayer Mahan, which called for a large fleet capable of offensive action. Herbert also became well known for leading a charge in Congress to reduce the funding of the United States Geological Survey, resulting in a public feud with paleontologist Othniel Charles Marsh.

Herbert espoused racist views during his tenure in Congress, namely in his opposition to the Reconstruction Acts. Herbert vocally opposed the  acts and any granting of suffrage to African Americans, speaking in congress and claiming African Americans were unfit to have such rights. He claimed "the granting of universal suffrage to the Negro was the mistake of the nineteenth century".

In 1893, President Grover Cleveland appointed Herbert as Secretary of the Navy. By this time Herbert was able to muster support for an enlarged navy, despite the Depression of 1893, and brought the fleet to some level of preparedness for the Spanish–American War.

From 1897, when he left his Cabinet seat, to his death on March 6, 1919, six days before his 85th birthday, Herbert practiced law in Washington, D.C.

Namesake
 was named in honor of Secretary Herbert.

References

 
 
Hammett, Hugh B. Hilary Abner Herbert: A Southerner Returns to the Union. Philadelphia: American Philosophical Society, 1976
Herbert, Hilary Abner. The Abolition Crusade and its Consequences; Four Periods of American History. New York: Scribner’s Sons, 1912.
Herbert, H. A. (1914). History of the Arlington Confederate Monument, by Hilary A. Herbert. Washington, D.C.: B.S. Adams, printer. Complete document is available for free here:

External links
 
 
 
 Retrieved on 2008-02-13

1834 births
1919 deaths
People from Greenville, Alabama
United States Secretaries of the Navy
Confederate States Army officers
People of Alabama in the American Civil War
Cleveland administration cabinet members
People from Laurens, South Carolina
Democratic Party members of the United States House of Representatives from Alabama
19th-century American politicians